Reflection is the second album by the Christian hardcore band, Unashamed and the first album to feature Drummer Jason Carson.

Critical reception
The album received several reviews, including magazines, Heaven's Metal, now known as HM Magazine, Garlic Press, and Campus Life.

Track listing

Personnel
Unashamed
 Jeff Jaquay - vocals
 Dan McManigal - guitar
 Bobby Canaday - guitar
 Matt Hernandez - bass
 Jason Carson - drums

Production
 Bob Moon - producer, engineer
 Brandon Ebel - executive producer
 Joe Foster - artwork
 Brian Gardner - mastering
 Aaron Warner - mixing assistant
 Brian White - sampling
 Matt Wignal - artwork

References

Unashamed (band) albums
1996 albums
Tooth & Nail Records albums